Clark Strand is an American author and lecturer on spirituality and religion. A former Zen Buddhist monk, he was the first Senior Editor of Tricycle: The Buddhist Review. He left that position in 1996 and moved to Woodstock, NY, US to write and teach full-time.

Biography
Clark Strand was raised as a Southern Presbyterian and studied philosophy and religion at Sewanee: The University of the South.

Strand's early explorations into Zen Buddhism enabled him to become a leader in this sect while residing at a Rinzai Zen Buddhist monastery. But he left this monastic order, and engaged in self-discovery through psychoanalysis, while working as the editor of Tricycle. In this position, he fortuitously learned about many schools of Buddhism in Asia and the West. He also explored the activities of various religious communities, including Buddhist temples, Hasidic synagogues, Christian monasteries and Hindu cults, in order to understand religion’s compatibility with the realities of modern life.

In January, 2000, Strand founded the Koans of the Bible Study Group (since renamed Woodstock Buddhist Bible Study), a weekly inter-religious discussion group devoted to finding a new paradigm for religious belief and practice.

In the early 2,000s, he began exploring the Soka Gakkai International originated from Soka Gakkai Japan, a humanistic religion based on the teachings of the 13th century Japanese monk, Nichiren who lived in Kamakura period. Strand's studies of this religion led him to write Waking the Buddha. Selection from this book: "One of the most striking things about the Soka Gakkai from a Buddhist point of view is its emphasis on attaining victory in ordinary life--sometimes under extraordinary circumstances...members chant the mantra-like title of the Lotus Sutra, Nam-myoho-renge-kyo, as a way of harnessing the universal life force inherent in their own bodies and minds...That principle of interconnectedness corresponds with what we know today about particle physics and planetary ecology, both of which support the view that all things are intimately interrelated and dependent upon one another-- that nothing exists as separate and alone."

Strand has written five other books, as well as articles on a variety of religious, spiritual and ecological themes. He writes for The Washington Post, The Huffington Post, The New York Times, Newsweek’s On Faith Blog, Tricycle, Body & Soul, Spirituality & Health and several other publications.

Workshops, Lectures, Conferences
Clark Strand has taught at workshops and retreats, lectured at colleges and universities in America and Japan, and has spoken at large Buddhist gatherings.

He is the founder of the Green Meditation Society in Woodstock, New York. This movement promotes an ecologically-based approach to spiritual practice, while bringing together like-minded people of different faiths and professions, and drawing upon the environmental teachings of the world's great religious traditions. He leads discussion groups and lectures on this topic in his hometown and at the Judson Memorial Church (in NYC’s Greenwich Village), which defines itself as "a sanctuary for progressive activism and artistic expression."

On May 14, 2015, Strand participated in the "First White House U.S. Buddhist Leaders Conference." He is quoted in The Washington Post, regarding this conference, “Buddhism was much more of a personal extreme sport. You went off to a monastery and mediated while your friends played golf. You were following some inner quest for enlightenment. But then came the maturation of Buddhism in America, where you look up from the meditation cushion and say: What does this actually mean, in terms of my citizenry, profession, relationship to others?”

Works
The Way of the Rose: The Radical Path of the Divine Feminine Hidden in the Rosary  (2019) (with Perdita Finn)
Waking up to the Dark: Ancient Wisdom for a Sleepless Age  (2015) 
Waking the Buddha: How the Most Dynamic and Empowering Buddhist Movement in History Is Changing Our Concept of Religion  (2014)  
How to Believe in God: Whether You Believe in Religion or Not  (2009)
Meditation Without Gurus: A Guide to the Heart of the Practice  (2003)
The Wooden Bowl: Simple Meditations for Everyday Life  (1998)
Seeds from a Birch Tree: Writing Haiku and the Spiritual Journey  (1997)

See also
 Buddhism
 Buddhism in Japan
 Nichiren Buddhism
 Buddhism in the West
 Buddhism in the United States
 Japanese new religions

References

External links
 First White House U.S. Buddhist Leaders Conference 
 Stories by Clark Strand
 Soka Gakkai International USA
 Bridging Buddhism and the Bible: An Interview with Clark Strand
 Clark Strand: Life and Work 
 Tricycle magazine Interview: Daisaku Ikeda
 Clark Strand on You Tube
 A Book Excerpt on Enthusiasm.
 Understanding Nichiren Buddhism: Articles from Tricycle magazine
 Christian Buddhism in "Buddhist Geeks"

American spiritual teachers
American spiritual writers
Living people
American magazine editors
Sewanee: The University of the South alumni
People from Woodstock, New York
Year of birth missing (living people)